Krasny Oktyabr is a rural locality (a village) in Starokuktovsky Selsoviet, Ilishevsky District, Bashkortostan, Russia. The population was 154 as of 2010. There are 2 streets.

Geography 
Krasny Oktyabr is located 15 km north of Verkhneyarkeyevo (the district's administrative centre) by road. Ibragim is the nearest rural locality.

References 

Rural localities in Ilishevsky District